Gardawice is a dzielnica in of Orzesze, Silesian Voivodeship, southern Poland. It was an independent village and in the years 1945-1954 and 1973-1975 it was seat of gmina, which was administratively merged into Orzesze in 1975. It has an area of 7.7 km² and about 1940 inhabitants.

History 
The village existed already in the 14th century.

After World War I in the Upper Silesia plebiscite 419 out of 507 voters in Gardawice voted in favour of joining Poland, against 84 opting for staying in Germany. 

In 1945 it became a seat of gmina that encompassed also Królówka, Woszczyce, Zawiść, Zazdrość and Zgoń.

References

Neighbourhoods in Silesian Voivodeship
Mikołów County